The Salvitti Family Gymnasium previously known as the Henry Memorial Center is a multi-purpose collegiate sports complex on the campus of Washington & Jefferson College. It houses two main athletic facilities, a gymnasium and a natatorium. The Henry Memorial Center is adjacent to the Ross Recreation Center, a wrestling practice room, and Eaton Fitness Center. The new side of the building houses coaches’ and administrative offices. The bottom floor houses the locker room facilities and an athletic training room. The building was built in 1970 and renovated in the summer of 2019. 

The main gymnasium serves as the home site for W&J's wrestling, volleyball, and men's basketball team and the women's basketball teams. Its renovated bleachers can hold 1,500 spectators.

The natatorium serves as the event center for the men's and women's swimming and diving teams as well as the men's and women's water polo squads. The facility has a six-lane, 25-yard pool, with depths ranging four to seven feet deep. The pool has a separate diving well and diving boards of one and three meter heights. A balcony overlooking the pool can house approximately 300 spectators.

The natatorium was the site of the 1976 and 1980 NCAA Division III Men's Swimming and Diving Championships.

References

External links

Sports venues in Pennsylvania
College swimming venues in the United States
Washington & Jefferson Presidents sports venues
Washington & Jefferson Presidents men's basketball
Buildings and structures completed in 1970
Basketball venues in Pennsylvania